A fryer is a container for frying food.

Fryer may also refer to:

People
Fryer (surname)

Places 
Fryer, Kentucky, a community in the United States
Fryers Forest
Fryer House

Other uses
Deep fryer
Pressure fryer
Air fryer
Turkey fryer
Vacuum fryer
Bratt pan fryer
An intermediate size (2.5-4.5 lbs.) of chicken

See also 
Frere
Freer (disambiguation)
Fryar
Friar
Frier